Ronald Paul Tomsic (born April 3, 1933) is an American former basketball player.

Tomsic, a  guard born in Oakland, California, played college basketball at Stanford University from 1951–1955. A three-time All-PCC selection, he scored 1,416 points in his Stanford career, the most in school history at the time. He scored 40 points in a game against USC in 1955, sixth on the school's single-game scoring list, and  still holds Stanford's single-season field goal attempts record. His name appears near the top of many other Stanford basketball scoring records.

Following his graduation from Stanford, Tomsic was drafted by the Syracuse Nationals in the 1955 NBA Draft but did not play in the NBA. He played AAU basketball for the San Francisco Olympic Club, and in 1956, was selected to be on the United States national basketball team for the 1956 Summer Olympics. In the Olympics, he scored 89 points for Team USA as the United States dominated its competition on the way to the gold medal. Ron has 3 children, Mark, Jill and Todd.

References

External links
 Medal record at databaseOlympics.com

1933 births
Living people
Amateur Athletic Union men's basketball players
Basketball players at the 1956 Summer Olympics
Medalists at the 1956 Summer Olympics
Olympic gold medalists for the United States in basketball
Basketball players from Oakland, California
Stanford Cardinal men's basketball players
Syracuse Nationals draft picks
United States men's national basketball team players
American men's basketball players
Guards (basketball)